Øyangen may refer to:

Places
Øyangen (Valdres), a lake in Innlandet county, Norway
Øyangen (Gran), a lake in Innlandet and Akershus counties, Norway
Øyangen (Nord-Fron), a lake in Innlandet county, Norway
Øyangen (Ringerike), a lake in Buskerud county, Norway

People
Gunhild Elise Øyangen (born 1947), a Norwegian politician